The Svans are an ethnic subgroup of the Georgians (Kartvelians) living mostly in Svaneti, a region in northwest Georgia. They speak the Svan language and are mostly bilingual also in Georgian. Both these languages belong to the Kartvelian (South Caucasian) language family. In the pre-1930 Soviet census, the Svans were afforded their own "ethnic group" (natsional'nost) category. The self-designation of the Svan is Mushüan, which is probably reflected in the ethnonym Misimian of the Classical authors.

History

The Svans are usually identified with the Sanni mentioned by Greek geographer Strabo, who placed them more or less in the area still occupied by the modern-day Svans.

In the Russian Empire and early Soviet Union Mingrelians and Svans had their own census grouping, but were classified under the broader category of Georgian in the 1930s. They are Georgian Orthodox Christians, and were Christianized in the 4th–6th centuries. However, some remnants of pre-Christian beliefs have been maintained. Saint George (known as Jgëræg to the locals), a patron saint of Georgia, is the most respected saint. The Svans have retained many of their old traditions, including blood revenge, although this tradition has been declining over time and as law enforcement takes hold. Their families are small, and the husband is the head of his family. The Svan strongly respect the older women in families.

Language
Typically bilingual, they use both Georgian and their own, unwritten Svan language. Prior to the 19th century, many Svans were monolingual, only knowing the Svan language. However, Svan is being largely replaced by Georgian, which is the language of culture and education in Georgia.

Genetics
The most common Y-chromosomal haplogroup among the Svans is G2a (90%), in the second place is the Y-chromosomal haplogroup R1a (5%), in the third place is the Y-chromosomal haplogroup J2a1 (about 3%). Among mitochondrial haplogroups H (17.9%), K (15.8%), W6 (13%), T (9.24%), U1 (7.61%), X2 (6, 52%), U2 (5.98%) are common haplogroups.

Famous Svans
 Temur Babluani (1948-), film director, script writer, and actor
 Géla Babluani (1979-), Georgian-French film director
 Mikheil Gelovani (1893–1956), actor who primarily portrayed Stalin
 Otar Ioseliani (1934-), film director in Georgia
 Mikheil Kurdiani (1954-2010), philologist, linguist, writer, poet and translator
 Sopho Gelovani (1984-), singer
 Tariel Oniani (1952-), mafia boss
 Yaroslav Iosseliani (1912-1978), Soviet Navy submarine commander
 Nana Ioseliani (1962-), chess player

References

External links

People from Georgia (country) by ethnic or national origin